Round Mountain may refer to:

United States

Communities
Round Mountain, Alabama
Round Mountain, California
Round Mountain, Nevada
Round Mountain, Texas

Mountains

Round Mountain (Taconic Mountains), on the Connecticut/Massachusetts border
Round Mountain (Massachusetts), a former peak of the Holyoke Range, nearly leveled by quarrying
Round Mountain, a mountain in Gallatin County, Montana
Round Mountain, a mountain in Mineral County, Montana
Round Mountain (Hamilton County, New York), in the Adirondack Mountains
Round Mountain (Herkimer County, New York), in the Adirondack Mountains
Round Mountain (Utah), a summit in Castle Valley
Round Mountain (Washington), in Skagit County
Round Mountain, a mountain located near Mica Peak in Spokane County, Washington

Other uses
Round Mountain Gold Mine
Battle of Round Mountain, a battle during the U. S. Civil War for control of Indian Territory in 1861

Australia

Community
 Round Mountain, New South Wales, a town in coastal northeastern New South Wales

Mountains
Round Mountain (New England Tableland), a peak in the New England region of northeastern New South Wales
Round Mountain (Snowy Mountains), a peak in the Snowy Mountains of southeastern New South Wales

Canada
Round Mountain (volcano),  an eroded volcanic outcrop in the Garibaldi Volcanic Belt in British Columbia

See also
 Rounds Mountain, a peak in the Taconic Mountains, United States